Henry FitzRoy (2 May 1807 – 17 December 1859) was a British politician of the mid-nineteenth century.

Early life
Born into the family of the Dukes of Grafton, he was a great-great-great-great-grandson of King Charles II. He was second son of Lieutenant-General George FitzRoy, 2nd Baron Southampton, by his second wife Frances Isabella, daughter of Lord Robert Seymour. Charles FitzRoy, 3rd Baron Southampton, was his elder brother. His grandparents were Charles FitzRoy, 1st Baron Southampton and Anne Warren, daughter and co-heir of Adml. Sir Peter Warren and a descendant of the Schuyler family, the Van Cortlandt family, and the Delancey family, all from British North America.

Career
FitzRoy was returned to Parliament for Great Grimsby in 1831, a seat he held until 1832, and later represented Lewes between 1837 and 1841 and between 1842 and 1859. He was appointed Civil Lord of the Admiralty from 1845 to 1846. He served under the Earl of Aberdeen as Under-Secretary of State for the Home Department between 1852 and 1855 and under Lord Palmerston as First Commissioner of Works between June and December 1859. In 1855 he was sworn of the Privy Council.

Family
FitzRoy married Hannah, daughter of Nathan Mayer Rothschild, in 1839. They had two children, Arthur Frederic FitzRoy (1842–1858), and Caroline Blanche Elizabeth FitzRoy, who married the artist Sir Coutts Lindsay, Bt. Hannah died on 2 December 1864, aged 49.

Death
FitzRoy died on 17 December 1859 and was buried at City of Westminster Cemetery, Hanwell along with his wife.

Legacy
Fitzroy Memorial Library was built in 1862 in memory of FitzRoy, by his wife. In 1897 it was adopted by the town of Lewes as the first public library and remained so until 1956.

References and sources
References

Sources

External links 
 

1807 births
1859 deaths
Younger sons of barons
Lords of the Admiralty
UK MPs 1831–1832
UK MPs 1837–1841
UK MPs 1841–1847
UK MPs 1847–1852
UK MPs 1852–1857
UK MPs 1857–1859
UK MPs 1859–1865
Henry
Schuyler family
English people of Dutch descent
Members of the Parliament of the United Kingdom for Great Grimsby
Members of the Privy Council of the United Kingdom